Jean-François d'Orgeix (15 April 1921 – 4 July 2006) was a French equestrian, actor and Olympic medalist. He was born in Cap-d'Ail. He competed in show jumping at the 1948 Summer Olympics in London, where he won a bronze medal in the individual contest. He also competed in show jumping at the 1952 Summer Olympics in Helsinki, and placed fifth with the French team.

Under the name of Jean Pâqui he appeared in more than twenty films between 1933 and 1958.

Selected filmography
 The House of Mystery (1933)
 Beethoven's Great Love (1937)
 Mother Love (1938)
 Girl with Grey Eyes (1945)
 The Captain (1946)
 Vendetta in Camargue (1950)
 Dakota 308 (1951)
 A Caprice of Darling Caroline (1953)
 The Beautiful Otero (1954)
 Serenade of Texas (1958)

References

External links

1921 births
2006 deaths
French male equestrians
French male film actors
Olympic equestrians of France
Olympic bronze medalists for France
Equestrians at the 1948 Summer Olympics
Equestrians at the 1952 Summer Olympics
Olympic medalists in equestrian
Medalists at the 1948 Summer Olympics
20th-century French people